Deer Falls is the uppermost waterfall on the North Fork Skykomish River.  The falls occur within a short but impressive canyon just above the mouth of Goblin Creek.

The falls are the second largest waterfall on either of the river's two forks, the largest on the North Fork and is said to be the best on either fork.  At this point the river hurtles  in one drop into a deep, blue pool.

Access 

Access to Deer Falls is anything but easy to access. You have to climb down about 100–150 feet from the road to the canyon edge. From this point, you can see the falls but at the same time you are sitting 150-200 above the raging North Fork.

References 

Waterfalls of Snohomish County, Washington
Waterfalls of Washington (state)
Horsetail waterfalls